Alps (translit. Alpeis) is a 2011 Greek psychological drama film produced by Athina Rachel Tsangari and Yorgos Lanthimos and directed by Lanthimos. It stars Angeliki Papoulia, Ariane Labed and Aris Servetalis, and was co-written by Lanthimos and Efthymis Filippou. It premiered in competition at the 68th Venice International Film Festival where it won Osella for Best Screenplay, and also won the Official Competition Prize for New Directions in Cinema at the Sydney Film Festival in 2012.

Plot
The film opens with a gymnast complaining to her coach because he will not let her perform to a pop song, which he states she is not ready for. They are members of a group known as Alps, whose members offer, for a fee, to act as the recently deceased during visits to their grieving relatives. After a serious car crash involving a young female tennis player, the ambulance driver and leader of Alps, "Mont Blanc," recruits the assisting nurse into the group. The nurse, who has few obligations other than taking care of her ageing and widowed father, becomes "Monte Rosa" and grows attached to the tennis player, convincing herself that she will recover. The gymnast, believing she will die, states that she wants to be the stand-in for the tennis player after she passes. The tennis player does eventually die, and Monte Rosa offers the services of the Alps to her grieving parents while lying to the rest of the group that the girl has recovered.

Alps offers its services to various grieving parties, including a married man mourning his fun-loving mistress, a blind woman with a deceased, philandering husband, and a man who is mourning an old friend. The clientele instructs the members of Alps as to what they should wear, do, and say, constructing scenarios of their choosing, which sometimes crosses into emotionally intimate or sexual encounters; however, these scenes tend to be emotionless and transactional. Despite this, Monte Rosa grows attached to the role of the tennis player and spends a lot of time with the grieving family, cuddling with the tennis player's father and pretending to date a classmate. 

The other members of Alps grow suspicious when Monte Rosa fails to show up to their meetings and lies about her whereabouts. Eventually the truth is discovered and Mont Blanc violently removes her from the group due to her dishonesty and incompetence. Monte Rosa visits her father, and her affected behavior when conversing with him implies that she has been attempting to act as a "stand-in" for her mother. When she attempts to fondle him, he slaps her, and she leaves. She visits a club she had patronized with him earlier in the film and aggressively tries to dance with another patron before returning to the tennis player's house. She breaks into the home, setting off the alarm, and climbs into bed before being forcibly thrown out by the father as she desperately attempts to initiate another scene with the family. Finding herself locked out of the home, she stands at the garage door, appearing lost and uncertain.

The gymnast finally performs elegantly to a pop song as her coach looks on proudly. After it is finished, she runs into his arms and tells him that he is the best coach in the world, mirroring an earlier scene in the film where they share a bizarre, sadomasochistic moment. After saying this, her expression falls and becomes cryptic, leaving their true relationship ambiguous.

Cast
Angeliki Papoulia as Nurse/"Monte Rosa"
Aris Servetalis as Ambulance Man/"Mont Blanc"
Ariane Labed as Gymnast
Johnny Vekris as Coach
Efthymis Filippou as Lighting shop owner
Stavros Psyllakis as Nurse's Father⁣
Eftychia Stefanidou as Blind Lady⁣
Sotiris Papastamatiou as Tennis Player's Father⁣
Maria Kyrozi as Tennis Player
Tina Papanikolaou as Tennis Player's Mother⁣
Konstadina Papoulia Nurse's Father's Girlfriend⁣
Nikos Galgadis as Tennis Player's Boyfriend⁣

Production
Yorgos Lanthimos and Efthymis Filippou developed the premise for the film out of the idea of people who allege something which is fabricated, for example via prank calls or by announcing their own deaths. The story took form as they needed a setting which could work well cinematically. Lanthimos considers it the complete opposite of his previous film, Dogtooth, which he says "is the story of a person who tries to escape a fictitious world. Alps is about a person who tries to enter a fabricated world."

The film was produced by Tsangari's production company Haos Film, which had previously produced Lanthimos' 2005 film Kinetta. The budget included funding from the Greek Film Center. Filming started in October 2010. Some scenes were added on the set and parts of the dialogue were improvised by the actors.

Reception
The film premiered on 3 September 2011 in competition at the 68th Venice International Film Festival. Lee Marshall of Screen Daily started by comparing Alps to the director's last film. He called it "a sort of Dogtooth 2", and wrote that "the cultured urban audiences turned on by the sheer kookiness of that film may feel a slight sense of déjà vu here." On the film in its own right, Marshall wrote: "Hollywood might have fashioned a weepie or a thriller out of the same material - and there are echoes here of some of Hitchcock's fascination with surrogates, from the Roger Thornhill/George Kaplan of North by Northwest to the Madeleine/Carlotta of Vertigo. But Alps is so intriguing because of what it refuses to explain... It's also a film which manages to juggle absurdist comedy with bleak tragedy, a yearning desire for human warmth with outbreaks of sudden violence, all the while maintaining an impressive control of tone."

In 2012, Roger Ebert reviewed Alps on his website, giving the film a rating of two-and-a-half out of four stars. He found the movie's thematic meaning complicated, and concluded that although Alps "is provocative and challenging, it is so completely self-contained that it has no particular emotional payoff... But Alps has the effect of a sterile exercise."

References

External links
 
 
 myFILM.gr
 News story on Alps
 
 

2011 drama films
2011 films
2010s psychological drama films
Films set in Greece
Films directed by Yorgos Lanthimos
Greek drama films
2010s Greek-language films